Rawle Glacier is a tributary glacier in the Concord Mountains, flowing northwest between Leitch Massif and King Range into the Black Glacier. Named by the northern party of New Zealand Geological Survey Antarctic Expedition (NZGSAE), 1963–64, for Russell Rawle, leader at Scott Base, 1964.
https://archway.archives.govt.nz/ViewEntity.do?code=ACIV

Glaciers of Pennell Coast